The South Moluccan pitta (Erythropitta rubrinucha) is a species of pitta. It was formerly considered a subspecies of the red-bellied pitta.  It is endemic to Indonesia where it occurs on Buru and Seram.  Its natural habitat is subtropical or tropical moist lowland forests.  It is threatened by habitat loss.

References

South Moluccan pitta
Birds of Buru
Birds of Seram
South Moluccan pitta